Harold Michael Gray (October 26, 1935 – April 30, 2013) was an American writer, screenwriter, cinematographer, film producer and director.

Career

Film and TV

In 1965, Mike Gray and Jim Dennett co-founded The Film Group, a Chicago film production company. In 1968, the pair along with editor Howard Alk, produced the award-winning  documentary American Revolution 2 (1969), followed by the trio's The Murder of Fred Hampton (1971). The Film Group was also behind the seven part educational series, "Urban Crisis and the New Militants", consisting primarily of footage shot during the production of American Revolution 2 but also includes footage of Chicago Black Panthers members (including future Congressman Bobby Rush) and a 1966 Civil Rights march in  Cicero, Illinois.

After moving to California, Gray shot The Gift (1973), a documentary about the life and art of Marc Chagall then co-wrote, with T. S. Cook and James Bridges, the screenplay for the nuclear thriller The China Syndrome (1979), which film became notable for opening 12 days before the Three Mile Island accident  (nuclear reactor meltdown).  He also wrote and directed Wavelength (1983), an independent science fiction film starring  Robert Carradine, Cherie Currie, and Keenan Wynn, with a soundtrack by Tangerine Dream.

Gray next co-created the television series Starman (1986–87). Following Starman, he became series writer/producer for the 1988–89 season of Star Trek: The Next Generation.  Gray was a second unit director on The Fugitive (1993) and acted as Swizlard in Chain Reaction (1996). Gray scripted The Zone and Forget About Yesterday in 2008, and was working with director Andy Davis and legendary filmmaker, Haskell Wexler on an as yet untitled documentary.

Bibliography
The Warning (1982), about the accident at Three Mile Island 
Drug Crazy: How We Got Into This Mess and How We Can Get Out (1998)
Angle of Attack (1992), a biography of Harrison Storms which also details America's race to the moon
The Death Game: The Luck of the Draw (2003)
Busted (2004), a book about the USA's drug war

Personal life
Gray grew up in Indiana and graduated from Purdue University with a degree in engineering. He later lived in Los Angeles, California with his wife, Carol, a reporter for public radio.  His son, Lucas, is a storyboard artist for The Simpsons.

Death
Gray died at his desk April 30, 2013.

References

External links
 
 Mike Gray (official website)
 Drug Crazy (official website)
 Film Group Collection, 1966-1969

American political writers
American male non-fiction writers
1935 births
2013 deaths